Michael Eric Dyson (born October 23, 1958) is an American academic, author, ordained minister, and radio host. He is a professor in the College of Arts and Science and in the Divinity School at Vanderbilt University. Described by Michael A. Fletcher as "a Princeton Ph.D. and a child of the streets who takes pains never to separate the two", Dyson has authored or edited more than twenty books dealing with subjects such as Malcolm X, Martin Luther King Jr., Marvin Gaye, Barack Obama, Nas's debut album Illmatic, Bill Cosby, Tupac Shakur and Hurricane Katrina.

Early life and education
Dyson was born on  October 23, 1958, in Detroit, Michigan, the son of Addie Mae Leonard, who was from Alabama. He was adopted by his stepfather, Everett Dyson. He attended Cranbrook School in Bloomfield Hills, Michigan, on an academic scholarship but left and completed his education at Northwestern High School. He became an ordained Baptist minister at nineteen years of age. Having worked in factories in Detroit to support his family, he entered Knoxville College as a freshman at the age of twenty-one. Dyson received his bachelor's degree, magna cum laude, from Carson–Newman College in 1985. He received a Ph.D. in religion from Princeton University in 1993 after completing a doctoral dissertation titled Uses of Heroes: Celebration and Criticism in the Interpretation of Malcolm X and Martin Luther King, Jr.

Career

Professor 
Dyson has taught at Chicago Theological Seminary, Brown University, the University of North Carolina at Chapel Hill, Columbia University, DePaul University, and the University of Pennsylvania. From 2007 to 2020, he was a Professor of Sociology at Georgetown University. In 2021, Dyson moved to Vanderbilt University where he holds the Centennial Chair and serves as University Distinguished Professor of African American and Diaspora Studies in the College of Arts and Science and University Distinguished Professor of Ethics and Society in the Divinity School. Between 2016 and 2018, he was a visiting professor at Middlebury College in Middlebury, Vermont.

Author 
His 1994 book Making Malcolm: The Myth and Meaning of Malcolm X became a New York Times notable book of the year. In his 2006 book Come Hell or High Water: Hurricane Katrina and the Color of Disaster, Dyson analyzes the political and social events in the wake of the catastrophe against the backdrop of an overall "failure in race and class relations". In 2010, Dyson edited Born to Use Mics: Reading Nas's Illmatic, with contributions based on the album’s tracks by, among others, Kevin Coval, Kyra D. Gaunt ("Professor G"), dream hampton, Marc Lamont Hill, Adam Mansbach, and Mark Anthony Neal. Dyson's own essay in this anthology, "'One Love,' Two Brothers, Three Verses", argues that the current US penal system disfavors young black males more than any other segment of the population. His last three books appeared repeatedly on the New York Times Bestseller list.

Commentator 
Dyson hosted a radio show, which aired on Radio One, from January 2006 to February 2007. He is also a commentator on National Public Radio, MSNBC and CNN, and is a regular guest on Real Time with Bill Maher. Beginning July 2011 Michael Eric Dyson became a political analyst for MSNBC. In May 2018, he participated in the Munk debate on political correctness, arguing alongside Michelle Goldberg against Stephen Fry and Jordan Peterson. In August 2018, he spoke at the funeral of Aretha Franklin.

Dyson served on the board of directors of the Common Ground Foundation, a project dedicated to empowering urban youth in the United States. Dyson and his third wife, Marcia L. Dyson, were regular guests and speakers at the Aspen Institute Conferences and Ideas Festival. Dyson most recently hosted a television show, The Raw Word.

The Michael Eric Dyson Show (2009-2011)

The Michael Eric Dyson Show radio program debuted on April 6, 2009, and is broadcast from Morgan State University. The show's first guest was Oprah Winfrey, to whom Dyson dedicated his book Can You Hear Me Now? The Inspiration, Wisdom, and Insight of Michael Eric Dyson. The show appears to have been discontinued with its last episode being in December 2011.

Beliefs 
Dyson's general philosophy is that American black people are continuing to suffer from generations of ongoing oppression.  On Fox News with Tucker Carlson, Dyson suggested that white Americans looking for ways to counter white privilege could make individual efforts to contribute time and money to support local black communities.

Awards and nominations

Bibliography 
Reflecting Black: African-American Cultural Criticism, Minneapolis: University of Minnesota Press, 1993. 
Making Malcolm: The Myth and Meaning of Malcolm X, New York: Oxford University Press, 1995. 
Race Rules: Navigating the Color Line, Reading, Massachusetts: Addison Wesley, 1996. 
Between God and Gangsta Rap: Bearing Witness to Black Culture, Oxford University Press, USA, 1997. 
I May Not Get There with You: The True Martin Luther King, Jr., New York: Free Press, 2000. 
Holler if You Hear Me: Searching for Tupac Shakur, New York: Basic Civitas Books, 2002. 
Open Mike: Reflections on Philosophy, Race, Sex, Culture and Religion, New York: Basic Civitas Books, 2002. 
Why I Love Black Women, New York: Perseus Books Group, 2002. 
The Michael Eric Dyson Reader, New York: Basic Civitas Books, 2004. 
Mercy, Mercy Me: The Art, Loves and Demons of Marvin Gaye, New York: Basic Civitas Books, 2005. 
Is Bill Cosby Right? Or Has the Black Middle Class Lost Its Mind?, New York: Basic Civitas Books, 2005. 
Pride: The Seven Deadly Sins, New York: Oxford University Press, 2006. 
Come Hell or High Water: Hurricane Katrina and the Color of Disaster, New York: Perseus Books Group, 2006. 
Debating Race, New York: Basic Civitas Books, 2007. 
Know What I Mean? Reflections on Hip Hop. New York: Basic Civitas Books, 2007. 
April 4, 1968: Martin Luther King's Death and How it Changed America, New York: Basic Civitas Books, 2008. 
Can You Hear Me Now? The Inspiration, Wisdom, and Insight of Michael Eric Dyson, New York: Basic Civitas Books, 2009. 
Born to Use Mics: Reading Nas's Illmatic, New York: Basic Civitas Books, 2010 (editor, with Sohail Daulatzai). 
The Black Presidency: Barack Obama and the Politics of Race in America, Boston: Houghton Mifflin Harcourt, 2016. 
Tears We Cannot Stop: A Sermon to White America, New York: St. Martin's Press, 2017. 
What Truth Sounds Like, New York: St. Martin's Press, 2018. 
JAY-Z: Made in America, New York: St. Martin's Press, 2019. 
Long Time Coming: Reckoning with Race in America, New York: St. Martin's Press, 2020. 
Entertaining Race: Performing Blackness in America, New York: St. Martin's Press, 2021.

References

External links

  
 
 

1958 births
Living people
African-American Baptist ministers
African-American social scientists
American social scientists
African-American non-fiction writers
American adoptees
American biographers
American political writers
Carson–Newman University alumni
Clergy from Detroit
DePaul University faculty
Georgetown University faculty
American male biographers
Michigan Democrats
Princeton University alumni
Writers from Detroit
American Book Award winners
MSNBC people
Historians of the civil rights movement